Anthocoris confusus is a species of minute pirate bug in the family Anthocoridae. It is found in Europe and Northern Asia (including China and Japan) and North America.

It lives on various deciduous trees and feeds on aphids , such as the subfamily Thelaxinae and Psylloidea and Psocoptera.It is found on willow (Salix ), beech ( Fagus ), maples (Acer), linden trees (Tilia), oak trees (Quercus), white thorns (Crataegus), elms (Ulmus), poplars (Populus) and ash (Fraxinus) among other trees.

References

Further reading

External links

 

Anthocoridae
Articles created by Qbugbot
Insects described in 1884
Hemiptera of Europe